Shajing Subdistrict is an administrative sub-division of China, may refer to:
 Shajing Subdistrict, Nanchang, Jiangxi
 Shajing Subdistrict, Nanning, Guangxi
 Shajing Subdistrict, Shenzhen, Guangdong